Khadija, Khadeeja or Khadijah is an Arabic feminine given name, the name of Khadija bint Khuwaylid, first wife of the Islamic prophet Muhammad. In 1995, it was one of the three most popular Arabic feminine names in the Muslim world, along with Fatima and Aisha. 

Hatice is the Turkish equivalent.
Other notable people with the name Khadija include:

Historical figures
Khadija Arslan Khatun, wife of 11th-century caliph al-Qa'im, mother of prince Muhammad bin Qa'im
Khadija Sultana (1600– fl. 1665), Indian regent
Khadijah of the Maldives, Sultana of the Maldives from 1347 to 1380
Khadija Gayibova, Azerbaijani pianist (1893–1938)
 Khadija bint Harun al-Rashid, a 9th-century Arab princess, daughter of famous Arab caliph Harun al-Rashid (r. 786–809)
 Khadija Riyad (1914–1981), Egyptian painter, sculptor, and jewelry designer

Living people
Khadija Abbouda (born 1968), Moroccan athlete
Khadija Ahrari, Afghan politician
Khadija al-Salami (born 1966), Yemeni film producer
Khadija Amin, Bangladesh Nationalist Party politician 
Khadija Arib (born 1960), Dutch politician
Khadijah Farrakhan, wife of Louis Farrakhan
Khadija Gbla, Australian anti-FGM campaigner
Khadijah Hashim (born 1942), Malaysian journalist and teacher
Khadija Ismayilova, Azerbaijani journalist
Khadija Lalla, (born 2007) Moroccan princess
Khadija Mumtaz (born 1955), Malayalam-language writer
Khadija Mushtaq, Pakistani academic administrator and educator
Khadija Qalanjo, Somali singer and dancer
Khadija Salum Ally Al-Qassmy (born 1958), Tanzanian politician
Khadeeja (actress) (died 2017), Malayalam-language film actress
Khadijah Whittington (born 1986), American basketball player

Fictional people
Khadijah James, character in the television series Living Single

See also
Khadija (disambiguation)

References

Arabic feminine given names
Khadija bint Khuwaylid